Federal Triangle Flowers is an outdoor 1998 sculptural work by Stephen Robin, installed in Woodrow Wilson Plaza, between the Ariel Rios Building and the Ronald Reagan Building and International Trade Center, in Washington, D.C., United States. The installation includes two pieces, one depicting a single stem rose and the other a lily. The cast-aluminum sculptures are set on limestone pedestals; both flowers measure approximately  x  x .

See also

 1998 in art
 List of public art in Washington, D.C., Ward 6

References

External links
 Federal Triangle Flowers, (sculpture)., Smithsonian Institution

1998 establishments in Washington, D.C.
1998 sculptures
Aluminum sculptures in Washington, D.C.
Outdoor sculptures in Washington, D.C.
Federal Triangle